Donald Dixon, Baron Dixon, PC, DL (6 March 1929 – 19 February 2017) was a British Labour Party politician.

Early life
Dixon worked in the Tyne shipyards and was a workers' representative before being elected.

Political career
Between 1963 and 1974 Dixon was leader of Jarrow Borough Council; after that council's abolition he spent five years as chairman of housing at South Tyneside.

He was Member of Parliament (MP) for Jarrow from 1979 until his retirement in 1997, serving as a party whip, and considered on the Old Right of the Party. He was subsequently elevated to the House of Lords as a life peer with the title Baron Dixon of Jarrow in the county of Tyne and Wear. He retired from the House of Lords on 9 February 2016.

Arms

References

Sources
 "Times Guide to the House of Commons", Times Newspapers Limited, 1992 edition.
 Dod's Parliamentary Companion.

1929 births
2017 deaths
Deputy Lieutenants of Tyne and Wear
GMB (trade union)-sponsored MPs
Labour Party (UK) MPs for English constituencies
Labour Party (UK) life peers
Members of the Privy Council of the United Kingdom
UK MPs 1979–1983
UK MPs 1983–1987
UK MPs 1987–1992
UK MPs 1992–1997
Life peers created by Elizabeth II